Esperanza Airport or Peñuela Airport  is an airport  east of Esperanza, a city in the Valverde Province of the Dominican Republic.

See also

Transport in Dominican Republic
List of airports in Dominican Republic

References

External links 
OpenStreetMap - Esperanza Field
SkyVector - Penuela Airport

Airports in the Dominican Republic
Buildings and structures in Valverde Province